Kid's Beat is a series of one-minute televised news segments that summarized topic such as sports, education and current events for children and preteens. The segments were broadcast in the United States on TBS from 1983 until the mid-1990s, between weekday afternoon children's animated cartoon programs.

Cancellation
In 1997, Kid's Beat has cancelled and replaced by Feed Your Mind, a TBS-produced children's newsmagazine featuring stories reported by kids on a range of topics. Many were former hosts of Kid's Beat.

1983 American television series debuts
1997 American television series endings
TBS (American TV channel) original programming
1980s American children's television series
1990s American children's television series
1980s American television news shows
1990s American television news shows
English-language television shows
American children's education television series
Television series about children